Madampitiya Grama Niladhari Division is a Grama Niladhari Division of the Colombo Divisional Secretariat of Colombo District of Western Province, Sri Lanka. 

Modara, Madampitiya and Rock House Army Camp are located within, nearby or associated with Madampitiya.

Madampitiya is a surrounded by the Mahawatta, Peliyagoda Gangabada, Modara and Mattakkuliya Grama Niladhari Divisions.

Demographics

Ethnicity 

The Madampitiya Grama Niladhari Division has a Moor plurality (39.6%), a significant Sri Lankan Tamil population (29.9%) and a significant Sinhalese population (28.9%). In comparison, the Colombo Divisional Secretariat (which contains the Madampitiya Grama Niladhari Division) has a Moor plurality (40.1%), a significant Sri Lankan Tamil population (31.1%) and a significant Sinhalese population (25.0%)

Religion 

The Madampitiya Grama Niladhari Division has a Muslim plurality (41.1%), a significant Buddhist population (23.5%), a significant Hindu population (20.8%) and a significant Roman Catholic population (11.3%). In comparison, the Colombo Divisional Secretariat (which contains the Madampitiya Grama Niladhari Division) has a Muslim plurality (41.8%), a significant Hindu population (22.7%), a significant Buddhist population (19.0%) and a significant Roman Catholic population (13.1%)

References 

Grama Niladhari Divisions of Colombo Divisional Secretariat